Jacob, Mimmi and the Talking Dogs is a 2019 Latvian–Polish animated film directed by Edmunds Jansons and based on the children's book Dog Town by Luīze Pastore. Funded by the National Film Centre of Latvia, Polish Film Institute and Creative Europe Media, the film is produced by Sabine Andersone for the Latvian Atom Art Studio and co-produced by Jakub Karwowski for the Polish Letko Studio. The film received several nominations, and won Best Animated Film at the 32nd International Film Festival for Children and Youth in Iran.

Synopsis 
The film follows Mimmi, who is sent to the suburbs to spend a summer with his uncle and cousin, Jacob, but they find out the local park is set to be transformed into new skyscrapers by a greedy businessman, and they decide to stop the development with the help of a pack of stray dogs that can talk.

Cast 
Eduards Olekts as Jacob
Nora Džumā as Mimmi
Andris Keišs as Boss
Kaspars Znotiņš as Tetis
Gatis Gāga as Eagle
Māra Liniņa as Mrs. Schmidt
Eduards Zilberts as Manny Pie

Release 
The film had its world premiere at the Giffoni Film Festival on 20 July 2019.

Accolades

References

External links 
Official website 

Jacob, Mimmi and the Talking Dogs at Filmas.lv – Latvian film database (in Latvian) 
Jacob, Mimmi and the Talking Dogs at MUBI

2019 films
2019 computer-animated films
2010s adventure comedy films
2010s children's animated films
Animated films about dogs
Environmental films
Latvian animated films
Polish animated films